Ashina Jiesheshuai (Middle Chinese (Guangyun) pronunciation: ; died 19 May 639) was a member of the Ashina clan of the Eastern Turkic Khaganate and general (Zhonglangjiang) of the Tang dynasty.

Background

He was one of Shibi Khan's sons and the younger brother of Ashina Shibobi, who was a vassal khagan of the Tang dynasty and used the title Tölis Khaghan..

Tang China defeated the Eastern Turkic Khaganate, which became a vassal state in 630. During this period, some Turkic nobles were members of the Chinese army. Ashina Jiesheshuai was among these nobles.

Jiucheng Palace raid

By summer 639, Ashina Jiesheshuai had lost favor with Emperor Taizong (because he had falsely accused his brother Ashina Shibobi of treason, which Emperor Taizong found despicable). He formed a conspiracy with Ashina Shibobi's son Ashina Hexiangu to assassinate Emperor Taizong at his summer palace called the Jiucheng Palace (九成宮, in modern Linyou County, Shaanxi). They had planned to wait for Li Zhi, the Prince of Jin, to depart from the palace in the morning and use that opportunity to attack the palace. On the day they planned, 19 May, Li Zhi did not leave the palace due to a storm. Ashina Jiesheshuai attacked the palace anyway, engaging the palace guards, but the guards were supported by troops who came outside. Ashina Jiesheshuai and his comrades stole some 20 horses from the stable. They fled to the north, but were caught by pursuers near the Wei River and killed.  Ashina Hexiangu was exiled to Lingbiao.

After this incident, officials began advocating for the sending of Turks (or Tujue, as they were known to the Chinese) away from the heart of the state. In fall 639, Emperor Taizong created a Tujue prince who had served him faithfully, Li Simo (né Ashina Simo) as the khan of a newly recreated Eastern Tujue state as Qilibi Khan, giving him all of the Tujue and Hu who had surrendered as his subordinates, to be settled north of the Great Wall and the Yellow River.  The Tujue people were fearful of Xueyantuo and initially refused to go to their new location. Emperor Taizong issued an edict to Xueyantuo's khan Yi'nan that he and Li Simo keep their peace and not attack each other, and after receiving from Yi'nan the assurance that he would not attack, the Tujue people moved to the new location.

Aftermath
Jiesheshuai's rebellion was unsuccessful. However, in 681, Qutlugh revolted against Tang and established the Second Turkic Khaganate in 682.

Cultural influences

A prominent Turkish nationalist, Nihal Atsız, used some characteristics of Ashina Jiesheshuai for a fictional character named Kür Şad in the novel Bozkurtların Ölümü (The Deaths of Gray Wolves). However, in the novel, the father of Kürşad is not Shibi Khan but Ashina Xichun (Çuluk Kağan).

See also
Tang campaign against the Eastern Turks#Aftermath in Mongolia
Turks in the Tang military

References

Göktürk people
639 deaths
Tang dynasty generals at war against the Göktürks
Year of birth unknown
Ashina house of the Turkic Empire
7th-century Turkic people